Michael Scanlan may refer to:

 Michael Scanlan (priest) (1931–2017), Roman Catholic priest
 Michael Scanlan (diplomat) (born 1961), American diplomat
 Michael Scanlan (poet) (1833–1917), Irish nationalist, editor, poet and writer

See also  
 Michael Scanlon (disambiguation)
 Scanlan (surname)